Kalo or KALO may refer to:
a member of certain subgroups of the Romani people of Western and Northern Europe (plural kale):
Calé
Kale (Welsh Roma)
Finnish Kale
the dialects of the Romani language, spoken by these groups
Caló 
Welsh Romani
Finnish Kalo
Kalo in Hawaii, the Hawaiian name of the Taro plant
KALO, a non-commercial, independent religious broadcasting television station serving Honolulu, Hawaii
Waterloo Regional Airport, a city-owned public-use airport serving Waterloo, Iowa, United States
Kalo, a town in the DRC

People 
 Isuf Kalo (born 1942), Albanian doctor, and professor of medicine
Sándor Kaló (born 1945), Hungarian former handball player
Shlomo Kalo (1928–2014), Israeli author and thinker, poet, composer and medical microbiologist

See also
Calo (disambiguation)
Kale (disambiguation)
Cale (disambiguation)
Names of the Romani people
Romani populations